Nubian Skin is a lingerie and hosiery brand specializing in ‘nude’ undergarments for women of colour. They are currently based in London. The brand officially launched in October 2014 and offers its garments in four tones: Berry, Cinnamon, Caramel and Café au Lait.

History
In October 2014, Nubian Skin was established by Ade Hassan. She began working on the idea in 2011 when she became frustrated with not being able to find hosiery in her own ‘nude’

Nubian Skin officially launched to trade at the Lingerie Edit, December 2014. The brand became well known after they went from 10 – 20,000 followers on Instagram in their first few weeks after being tweeted about by Kerry Washington. The brand has received interest from other notable women of colour including Beverley Knight, Thandiwe Newton and Beyoncé, in which she chose to include Nubian Skin in The Formation World Tour.
In May 2015, Nubian Skin announced they were extending their range to include up to 40" backs and A cups. Additionally, towards the beginning of January 2016, Nubian Skin launched a Curve Collection of nude hosiery to expand their inclusivity. They continue to work on their more-sizes campaign. Recently, Nubian SKin launched a new Africa Collection called "Moroccan Nights,a limited edition, luxury lingerie and sleep wear collection inspired by and made in Africa".

Now Nubian Skin are sold at several retailers including Fenwick (department store) Bond Street, ASOS.com, House of Fraser and Nordstrom.

Nubian Skin also supports the CoppaFeel! 'Bra Hijack' campaign.

Founder
Nubian Skin's founder Ade Hassan studied English and Economics at Duke University, and completed her masters at SOAS. She went on to work in the Finance industry  and in 2011 came up with the idea of Nubian Skin.  Ade founded the company in 2013. She was appointed a Member of the Order of the British Empire in the 2017 Queen's Birthday Honours for services to fashion.

Awards
In September 2015, Ade Hassan received the Fashion Entrepreneur of the Year Award at the Great British Entrepreneur Awards. In October 2015 Nubian Skin was nominated for Hosiery Brand of the Year at the UK Lingerie Awards, and won UK's Favourite British Designer of the Year. Recently, Ade was nominated as finalist for the Black British Business Awards.

References

Companies based in the London Borough of Camden
Lingerie brands